Francisco de Aguilar may refer to:
 Francisco de Aguilar (conquistador) (1479–1571?), Spanish conquistador and later Dominican friar, participant in the conquest of the Aztec Empire
 Francisco de Aguilar (politician) (fl. 1850s), 19th century Honduran politician and one-time interim president (1855–56)